Randy Hansen (born December 8, 1954) is an American guitarist best known for his "Rock Tribute Act" honoring Jimi Hendrix. He composed 17 minutes of the soundtrack for the 1979 movie Apocalypse Now, (1980 Academy Award Winner for Best Sound). His debut album was released in 1980 on Capitol Records and was recorded at the Automatt Studios in San Francisco with Scott Rosburg on bass and vocals and Charles Tapp on drums and vocals.  That group played two North American tours which included several coliseum shows with Bob Seger, Sammy Hagar, REO Speedwagon, Head East, Triumph, Poco and Blue Öyster Cult.

In 1984, Hansen impersonated Jimi Hendrix in the music video for Devo's cover of "Are You Experienced?". That same year, he also co-wrote the song "State of Shock" with Michael Jackson. He played with comedian Sam Kinison in 1991.

Hansen's Hendrix act first came to prominence with Randy Hansen's Machine Gun (1977–80), with Larry Epperly on bass guitar and Tim Kelliher on drums. All three had previously been in a band called Kid Chrysler and the Cruisers. Hansen's Machine Gun performed on bills with Heart, The Kinks, Stevie Ray Vaughan, and others, and were written up by Rolling Stone and Guitar Player.

After his debut album, Hansen's emphasis continued to be on original releases of the Jimi Hendrix style of composition, in addition to including large numbers of Hendrix compositions in his live shows. One of the high points of Hansen's career was when he played a short series of concerts with a band that included the original Jimi Hendrix Experience drummer, Mitch Mitchell and also with Buddy Miles from Jimi Hendrix and the Band of Gypsys. Since 1991, Hansen has toured Europe almost every year with Manni von Bohr on drums and Ufo Walter on bass, in addition to performing at outdoor music festivals. He continues to perform as a solo artist in the Pacific Northwest and elsewhere in the United States.

Hansen has four self-released CDs of original music in print, all available online - Old Dogs New Tricks, Good Intentions, Tower of Love and Funtown which was released on the German Jazzhaus records label.  He continues to live in Seattle. As of 2008, Hansen is on the roster of Gen-X Entertainment Intl. Inc., who also represent bands ranging from the Amazing Rhythm Aces to the current incarnation of Jefferson Starship.

Discography
 Randy Hansen, (Now Hear This, 1971)
 Randy Hansen (Capitol Records, 1980)
 Monster (Herbie Hancock album) (Columbia Records, 1980)
 Astral Projektion (Shrapnel Records, 1983)
 Classics Live - "A tribute to Jimi Hendrix" (Ananaz Records, 1992)
 Hendrix by Hansen (Grooveyard / Affengeil Records, 1993)
 Old Dogs New Tricks (Grooveyard / Green Tree Records, 1997)
 Thinking Of You' ' (Rudolf Music 2000)
 Tower Of Love (Grooveyard / Manni v. Bohr, 2000)
 Good Intentions (Grooveyard / Manni v. Bohr, 2003)
 Alter Ego (Randy Hansen, 2004)
 Live in Berlin DVD (Grooveyard, 2005)
 European Tour 2008 - Hendrix Live Live In Boston - December 1980'' (Rudolf Music, 2008)

References

External links

 
 Randy Hansen at RudolfMusic.com

Living people
1954 births
Musicians from Seattle
American rock guitarists
American male guitarists
20th-century American guitarists
20th-century American male musicians